Devalegama is a small town in Sri Lanka located on the A19 highway running from Kegalla to Polgahawela. The phrase 'Devalegama' means 'The village of the shrine'. The townspeople believe that this name originates from the fact that there is an ancient shrine dedicated to one of the local deities in the vicinity of the town.

Geography
The area is surrounded by low hills that have been mostly transformed into rubber plantations. The tallest peak of these is known as navugala, which has a triangulation point of the geodetic survey of Sri Lanka.  Among the hills there is a series of long interconnected alluvial-plains that are used for paddy cultivation. There is a small perennial stream that originates from the hills on the south of the town and flows across the center towards north to join the large river known as Ma Oya.

Expressway
Devalegama will be one of the important points along the new expressway planned to link Kandy city with the capital Colombo.

Highlights
Venerable Katukurunde Nanananda Thera, the former Dhamma teacher of Nissarana Vanaya and author of Concept and Reality, The Magic of the Mind etc. resided in the Pothgulgala Aranya in Devalegama.

Populated places in Sri Lanka